Richard Ronald Marlowe (born 10 August 1950) is a Scottish former professional footballer who played as a forward in the English Football League for Shrewsbury Town, Brighton & Hove Albion and Aldershot. He began his career with junior club Bonnyrigg Rose Athletic, was on the books of Derby County without representing them in the League, and went on to win the 1976–77 Southern League title with Wimbledon.

After retiring from Professional football Ricky took over as manager of Barclay Hearts, an Edinburgh amateur team, by that time he was playing in midfield with the late Jimmy (feed the bear ) Walker and Davy ( the cementer ) Leslie

References

1950 births
Living people
Footballers from Edinburgh
Scottish footballers
Association football forwards
Bonnyrigg Rose Athletic F.C. players
Derby County F.C. players
Shrewsbury Town F.C. players
Brighton & Hove Albion F.C. players
Aldershot F.C. players
Wimbledon F.C. players
Scottish Junior Football Association players
English Football League players
Southern Football League players